Maids Moreton is a village and civil parish in north-west Buckinghamshire, England, around  north of Buckingham. The village sits on top of a plateau overlooking Buckingham and is less than 1km away from the Foxcote Reservoir SSSI

Description and history
The soil is mostly clay and gravel and the subsoil gravel.

The village lies along the Buckingham to Towcester road (A413). It contains many 17th-century houses and cottages with timber frames with brick or plaster filling and thatched roofs.

The 15th-century parish church of Saint Edmund is said to have been built by two maiden ladies of the Pever family hence the name "Maids' Moreton". The Maids' memorials are a wall painting over the north door and brasses on a slab just within the doorway.

The old post office, situated at the junction of Main Street with the A413, closed in the mid-1990s and is now a private house. The chapel (on the A413) was demolished in the early 1980s and the allotments next to the chapel were all used for new housing.

Since 2015 the residents of Maids Moreton have been embroiled in a major planning dispute involving the proposed enlargement of the village by 40% (planning application 16/00151/AOP). Two documentary films have been produced and can be seen at the Maidsmoretonmatters.org website. A local resident, Patrick Hardcastle has launched an application for a Judicial Review in 2022. The planning application has been controversial with the proposed building on green field agricultural land, five different sets of biodiversity figures being produced by the developers, David Wilson Homes, and the Council ecologist found to have breached the CIEEM code of conduct in relation to how the application has been dealt with.

School
Maids Moreton Church of England School is a mixed Church of England voluntary controlled primary school in Maids Moreton. The school takes children between the ages of four and seven and has about 50 pupils.

References

External links

 North Buckingham Parish

Villages in Buckinghamshire
Civil parishes in Buckinghamshire